Ambulyx is a genus of moths in the family Sphingidae, described by Westwood in 1847.

Species

Ambulyx adhemariusa Eitschberger, Bergmann & Hauenstein, 2006
Ambulyx amara Kobayashi, Wang & Yano, 2006
Ambulyx amboynensis Rothschild, 1894
Ambulyx andangi Brechlin 1998
Ambulyx auripennis Moore 1879
Ambulyx bakeri (Clark 1929)
Ambulyx belli (Jordan 1923)
Ambulyx bhutana Brechlin, 2014
Ambulyx bima Rothschild & Jordan 1903
Ambulyx canescens Walker 1865
Ambulyx carycina (Jordan, 1919)
Ambulyx celebensis (Jordan 1919)
Ambulyx ceramensis (Joicey & Talbot 1921)
Ambulyx charlesi (Clark 1924)
Ambulyx clavata (Jordan 1929)
Ambulyx cyclasticta (Joicey & Kaye 1917)
Ambulyx dohertyi Rothschild 1894
Ambulyx flava (Clark, 1924)
Ambulyx flavocelebensis (Brechlin, 2009)
Ambulyx immaculata (Clark 1924)
Ambulyx interplacida Brechlin, 2006
Ambulyx inouei Cadiou & Holloway 1985
Ambulyx japonica Rothschild 1894
Ambulyx johnsoni (Clark 1917)
Ambulyx jordani (Bethune-Baker 1910)
Ambulyx kuangtungensis (Mell 1922)
Ambulyx lahora Butler 1875
Ambulyx latifascia Brechlin & Haxaire, 2014
Ambulyx lestradei Cadiou 1998
Ambulyx liturata Butler 1875
Ambulyx maculifera Walker 1866
Ambulyx marissa Eitschberger & Melichar, 2009
Ambulyx matti (Jordan 1923)
Ambulyx meeki (Rothschild & Jordan 1903)
Ambulyx montana Cadiou & Kitching 1990
Ambulyx moorei Moore 1858
Ambulyx naessigi Brechlin 1998
Ambulyx obliterata (Rothschild 1920)
Ambulyx ochracea Butler 1885
Ambulyx phalaris (Jordan 1919)
Ambulyx placida Moore 1888
Ambulyx pryeri Distant 1887
Ambulyx pseudoclavata Inoue 1996
Ambulyx pseudoregia Eitschberger & Bergmann, 2006
Ambulyx rawlinsi Melichar, Řezáč & Rindoš, 2015
Ambulyx regia Eitschberger, 2006
Ambulyx rudloffi Brechlin, 2005
Ambulyx schauffelbergeri Bremer & Grey 1853
Ambulyx semifervens (Walker 1865)
Ambulyx semiplacida Inoue 1990
Ambulyx sericeipennis Butler 1875
Ambulyx siamensis Inoue 1991
Ambulyx sinjaevi Brechlin 1998
Ambulyx staudingeri Rothschild 1894
Ambulyx substrigilis Westwood 1847
Ambulyx suluensis Hogenes & Treadaway 1998
Ambulyx tattina (Jordan 1919)
Ambulyx tenimberi (Clark 1929)
Ambulyx tobii (Inoue, 1976)
Ambulyx tondanoi (Clark 1930)
Ambulyx viteki Melichar & Řezáč, 2013
Ambulyx wildei Miskin 1891
Ambulyx wilemani (Rothschild & Jordan 1916)
Ambulyx zacharovi Ivshin, 2014
Ambulyx zhejiangensis Brechlin, 2009

 
Ambulycini
Moth genera
Taxa named by John O. Westwood